Madanur Ahmed Ali, is an Indian surgical gastroenterologist from Chennai. An alumnus of Madras Medical College, he is credited with several publications in peer reviewed journals. The Government of India honored Ali in 2011, with the fourth highest civilian award of Padma Shri.

See also

 Madras Medical College

References

Living people
Recipients of the Padma Shri in medicine
Medical doctors from Chennai
Indian surgeons
Indian gastroenterologists
Madras Medical College alumni
20th-century Indian medical doctors
Year of birth missing (living people)
20th-century surgeons